Fehn is a surname. Notable people with this surname include:

 Chris Fehn (born 1973), American musician
 Gustav Fehn (1892–1945), German general
 Hans-Georg Fehn (1943–1999), German water polo player
 Sverre Fehn (1924–2009), Norwegian architect

See also
 Fern (name)